The Brinevskoye mine is one of the largest gypsum mines in Belarus. The mine is located in the Gomel Region. The mine has reserves amounting to 182.5 million tonnes of  gypsum.

References 

Gypsum mines in Belarus